FreakingNews was a news-oriented Photoshop contest website that came online August 2, 2002 and officially opened on October 23, 2003  as a sister site of Worth1000. This virtual community of 17,000+ digital artists and members features free daily Photoshop contests that are fueled by global news and events.  Since its inception, FreakingNews has been featured on television shows, magazines and newspapers, including Comedy Central, MTV, Weekly World News, Glenn Beck Show, Stern Magazine, The Guardian, The Daily News, The Dallas Morning News, Los Angeles Times, The Daily Mail, and The Sun. The site closed in 2020.

History 
Vladislav Golunov and Rich Taylor became online friends in 2001 when Golunov contacted Taylor after he had seen a photo-manipulated image that Taylor had created under the pseudonym Internet screenname "Registered". Golunov had an existing website that posted humorous images with the visitor being able to leave comments or share the images via email. Taylor's news based parody and satire images have been circulated and often thought to be real by Internet users that had received them, primarily via email or posted in online forums. During one subsequent conversation, Taylor mentioned to Golunov that he wished there existed a community of Photoshoppers that would create, or "chop" images based on current news stories. Following this discussion, Golunov registered the domain and called the site "FreakingNews", as a mockery of "breaking news". Golunov bought the edited code for Photoshop contests from Worth1000—by then an already established Photoshop contest site. Apart from the custom code, Worth1000 played a major role in launching FreakingNews by promoting it to its member artists.

In April 2017, Golunov handed over the site to a new owner.

Google Jet hoax 
On December 6, 2007, Fox News showed the picture of the Google Jet Boeing 767, Page and Brin's personal plane, without realizing that the picture was a photo hoax created by a FreakingNews member for one of the Photoshop contests. Three months earlier, aviation news site Plane Nation, featured the same hoax image as a real photo in their article about the Google Jet Boeing 767. The Business Insider website also published this image on June 4, 2008.

Dora the Explorer mugshot controversy 
In May 2010 Dora the Explorer mugshot image, created by FreakingNews member AndWhat (Debbie Groben) for a FreakingNews Photoshop contest, was featured in the newspapers, magazines, and TV programs 
in light of the Arizona's Immigration Law debate. This mugshot image was used in the public rallies and was met with a lot of controversy, revealing some Americans' attitudes about race, immigrants and where some of immigration reform debate may be headed.

See also
 Fark
 Image editing
 Photo manipulation

References

External links

Art websites
Imageboards
Internet forums
Virtual communities
American photography websites